Epsilon Ophiuchi or ε Ophiuchi, formally named Yed Posterior, is a red giant star in the constellation of Ophiuchus. Located less than five degrees south of the celestial equator in the eastern part of the constellation, it forms a naked eye optical double with Delta Ophiuchi (named Yed Prior). With an apparent visual magnitude of 3.220, the star can be seen with the naked eye from most of the Earth under suitably dark skies.

Nomenclature
ε Ophiuchi (Latinised to Epsilon Ophiuchi) is the star's Bayer designation.

It bore the traditional name Yed Posterior. Yed derives from the Arabic يد yad meaning "hand". Epsilon and Delta Ophiuchi comprise the left hand of Ophiuchus (the Serpent Bearer) that holds the head of the serpent (Serpens Caput). In 2016, the International Astronomical Union organized a Working Group on Star Names (WGSN) to catalogue and standardize proper names for stars. The WGSN approved the name Yed Posterior for this star on 5 October 2016 and it is now so included in the List of IAU-approved Star Names.

Epsilon Ophiuchi was a member of the indigenous Arabic asterism al-Nasaq al-Yamānī, the "Southern Line" of al-Nasaqān the "Two Lines", along with Alpha Serpentis, Delta Serpentis, Epsilon Serpentis, Delta Ophiuchi, Zeta Ophiuchi and Gamma Ophiuchi.

Properties
Epsilon Ophiuchi has a stellar classification of G9.5 IIIb, with the luminosity class of III indicating that this is a giant star that has exhausted the hydrogen and evolved away from the main sequence. This red giant has nearly double the Sun's mass and has expanded to an estimated radius of over ten times the radius of the Sun, giving it a luminosity of about 54 times the Sun. It is about a billion years old.

Unusually for a class G giant, it is cyanogen-deficient and carbon-deficient. The outer envelope of this star displays solar-type oscillations with a period of 0.19 days, allowing the methods of asteroseismology to be applied. However, the models for this star have not been able to distinguish whether this star is generating energy by the thermonuclear fusion of hydrogen along a shell, or the fusion of helium at its core. Either model produces a good fit to the star's physical properties. The projected rotational velocity of the star is 5.7 km s−1, and the inclination of the rotation axis to the line of sight from the Earth lies in the range of 41–73°.

References

External links
 

G-type giants
Double stars

Ophiuchus (constellation)
Ophiuchi, Epsilon
Durchmusterung objects
Ophiuchi, 02
146791
079882
6075
Yed Posterior